Dolichopus longipennis is a species of long-legged fly in the family Dolichopodidae.

References

Further reading

External links

 

longipennis
Articles created by Qbugbot
Insects described in 1861
Taxa named by Hermann Loew